Epaphius chalybeus is a species of beetle in the family Carabidae. It is found in North America.

Subspecies
These four subspecies belong to the species Epaphius chalybeus:
 Epaphius chalybeus brachyderus Jeannel
 Epaphius chalybeus chalybeus
 Epaphius chalybeus coloradensis Schaeffer
 Epaphius chalybeus utahensis Schaeffer

References

Further reading

 

Articles created by Qbugbot
Beetles described in 1831